Jules Buysse (Wontergem, 13 August 1901 – 31 December 1950) was a Belgian racing cyclist.

Buysse was the youngest of three brothers who competed in the Tour de France. He won the first stage of 1926 Tour de France by 13 minutes and 6 seconds, allowing him to wear the yellow jersey for two days  until losing it to fellow Belgian Gustave Van Slembrouck. He finished the tour in 9th place.

His brothers were Lucien Buysse, who won the 1926 Tour de France, and Marcel Buysse who won six stages on the 1913 Tour.

Major results

1925
1925 Tour de France:
15th place overall classification
1926
1926 Tour de France:
Winner stage 1
Leading general classification for two days
9th place overall classification
1932
1932 Tour de France:
40th place overall classification

References

External links 

Official Tour de France results for Jules Buysse

Belgian male cyclists
Belgian Tour de France stage winners
1901 births
1950 deaths
People from Deinze
Cyclists from East Flanders